{{DISPLAYTITLE:C15H21NO3}}
The molecular formula C15H21NO3 (molar mass: 263.332 g/mol, exact mass: 263.1521 u) may refer to:

 Hydroxypethidine (Bemidone)
 Metostilenol

Molecular formulas